is an album by , released in 1988. It was the band's last album. On the year of its release it placed fourth on the Swedish Top Album Chart for a week.

Track listing

1988 albums
Imperiet albums